Hecyromorpha plagicollis is a species of beetle in the family Cerambycidae, and the only species in the genus Hecyromorpha. It was described by Gahan in 1904.

References

Crossotini
Beetles described in 1904
Monotypic beetle genera